Punchbowl is a suburb south west of Sydney,  west of the Sydney central business district, in the local government area of the City of Canterbury-Bankstown, in the state of New South Wales, Australia.

History 

Punchbowl is named for a circular valley, called "the punch bowl", which is actually located in the nearby suburb of Belfield at the intersection of Coronation Parade, Georges River and Punchbowl Roads. This feature gave its name to "Punch Bowl Road" (now Punchbowl Road). In the 1830s, an inn built by George Faulkener, close to the corner of Liverpool Road, was called the Punch and Bowl. John Stephens had a property there in the 1830s and his son is mentioned in the Wells Gazetteer in 1848, "Clairville or Punchbowl, in the Parishes of St George and Bankstown, is the property of Sir Alfred Stephens".

In the 1920s and 1930s, Punchbowl was a higher-class suburb, with a number of popular theatres that were closed down or demolished thirty years later. The Punchbowl Astoria opened on 17 July 1935 with seating for 915 persons. The final programme was shown on Wednesday 4 February 1959. The Astoria was eventually gutted and refitted as a three-storey office building. The Punchbowl Regent was situated on the corner of The Boulevarde and Matthews Street. Operated by Enterprise Theatres Ltd, the Regent opened on Saturday 24 May 1923, showing The White Rose. It was a large cinema with seating for 1,287 patrons. The last programme was shown on Wednesday 4 February 1959. The Regent was demolished in August 1964 and replaced by a block of shops.

Until 1987, Roselands was a neighbourhood within Punchbowl, though they still share the same postcode today (2196).

Commercial area 
Punchbowl has a relatively small shopping centre, although the selection is diverse. It thrived until the advent of Roselands and Bankstown Square in the late 1960s and its bisection by the upgrading of Punchbowl Road in the 1970s. It is centred on Punchbowl railway station, along The Boulevarde and Punchbowl Road. Local businesses and clubs reflect the diversity of the population. Punchbowl RSL was located on The Boulevarde until it closed in 2010 and The Mirage Hotel is on Punchbowl Road. Lebanese cuisine is well regarded in the suburb, to the extent that culinary walking tours of Punchbowl sell out months ahead. There are a number of Lebanese sweet shops in the suburb. In 2009, a gym opened at the Astoria theatre site.

For many years, Jack Walsh International Cycles, on Punchbowl Road, was one of the longest-serving shops in Punchbowl. It had been selling and repairing bicycles for over 60 years, until December 2007 when Walsh was unable to continue the business.

In December 2013 a new shopping centre, "The Broadway Plaza", was opened in Punchbowl "Broadway" near its train station. It comprises two levels of retail stores including Woolworths and Chemist Warehouse. The Plaza is surrounded by a complex of seven blocks of new apartments.

Transport 
Canterbury Road and Punchbowl Road provide the major road links into the suburb. The Boulevarde and South Terrace are also main roads. Punchbowl railway station is located on the Bankstown line of the Sydney Trains network. The line was opened in 1895 and electrified in 1926. Trains take around 25 minutes to Sydenham and 40 minutes to Central station.

The Punchbowl Road railway bridge replaced an old two-lane bridge in 1981. The foundations of the old bridge can still be seen west of the current one. The new bridge greatly aided traffic flow through the area but at the cost of effectively cutting the shopping centre in half.

Housing

Punchbowl is a mainly residential suburb. Much of the suburb was developed in the late 19th century and early 20th century, especially after the railway line to Bankstown was built. The suburb features a mixture of Federation, Art Deco and contemporary homes. Parts of Punchbowl have been redeveloped since the turn of the 21st century, with flats, townhouses and modern detached houses built.

Schools 

 Punchbowl Boys High School in Kelly Street, was established in 1955. 
 The school produced two Australian cricket fast bowlers, Len Pascoe and Jeff Thomson.
 Punchbowl Public School is located on Canterbury Road.
 Saint Charbel's College is located on Highclere Avenue. 
 Saint Jeromes Catholic Primary School is located on Rossmore Avenue,

Population

Demographics 
The first Europeans in the area were British and Irish settlers in the 19th century. By the mid-20th century, the suburb had absorbed many migrants of Italian and Greek origin. From the mid-1970s, Punchbowl became a very popular location with migrants from Lebanon.

The most common countries of birth were Lebanon 12.6%, Vietnam 5.3%, Bangladesh 2.9%, Pakistan 2.9% and China 2.7%. 21.2% of people only spoke English at home. Other languages spoken at home included Arabic 36.1%, Vietnamese 7.1%, Greek 3.9%, Bengali 3.5% and Urdu 3.1%. The most common responses for religion were Islam 35.8% and Catholic 23.7%.

Notable residents 

 Danny Adcock, actor
 Lex Banning (1921–1965), poet
 Mark Bouris, businessman
 John Burgess, television host 
 Wes Davoren (1928–2010), politician
 Yahya El Hindi, association football player
 Paul Keating, 24th Prime Minister of Australia
 Akmal Saleh, comedian
 Mark Saliba, comedian and amateur prizefighter
 Vince Sorrenti, comedian 
 The Hard-Ons, a punk rock band

Fictional characters
 Trent from Punchy

In popular culture
 Punchbowl has featured in several Australian books including the satirical They're a Weird Mob by "Nino Culotta" (a nom de plume of John O'Grady), which was made into a feature film of the same name. The Mirage Hotel was referred to in the film as "the bloodhouse".
 The film The FJ Holden (1977) featured several locations in Punchbowl including the Sundowner Hotel on the corner of Punchbowl and Canterbury Roads, a popular pub and band venue until the licence was sold. The buildings served as a Croatian Club until a new club was built.
 The television drama series Dangerous was set in and around Punchbowl.
 YouTube celebrity Trent from Punchy is a fictional character portrayed by Nicholas Boshier. The character's name is derived from his claim to be from Punchbowl.

See also

 Sydney punchbowls

References

External links 

 

City of Canterbury-Bankstown
Suburbs of Sydney
Muslim enclaves